CFSO-TV is a Canadian television station, licensed to and serving Cardston, Alberta. It is owned by Logan & Corey McCarthy.

Programming
CFSO's  programming is community and religious-oriented, along with some Mormon-based programming from BYU Television.

External links
Channel 32
CRTC Decision
CFSO-TV history - Canadian Communication Foundation

Canadian community channels
FSO
FSO
Christian television stations in Canada
Cardston
Television channels and stations established in 1983
1983 establishments in Alberta